916  is a 2012 Malayalam drama film written and directed by M. Mohanan, starring  Mukesh,  Anoop Menon, Malavika Menon, Asif Ali and Meera Vasudev. The film is about maintaining the sanctity of familial relationships.

Plot
916 focuses mainly on the relationship between a single father, Dr. Harikrishnan, and his 12th grade daughter Meera. It narrates the events of two closely knit families losing their balance; Harikrishnan's, and Dr. Ramesh's, his wife and their two children. While Dr. Harikrishnan is an altruist who considers his profession a means to serve society, Dr. Ramesh thinks otherwise. Prasanth appears as a romantic interest of Meera, leading her astray into the world of malls, cellphones, and the Internet.  The movie comes to a twist when Meera goes missing.

Cast

Soundtrack
Music was composed by M. Jayachandran.

Reception

916 got mixed reviews upon release.
Kerala9.com gave the movie 2/5 stars, ending with a verdict "Not up to the mark; no ‘916 purity’...". theaterbalcony.com gave 68% and said that "It is great that 916 tried to bring lots of social awareness,  however there should be an equal importance to the entertainment factor too, however the latter was missing from 916 most of the time"

References

2010s Malayalam-language films
2012 drama films
Indian drama films
2012 films
Films scored by M. Jayachandran